Plagiostoma is a genus of fossil saltwater clams, marine bivalve mollusks in the family Limidae, the file clams.

Species

Plagiostoma aurita Popov 1964
Plagiostoma bellula Morris and Lycett 1853
Plagiostoma delettrei Coquand 1852
Plagiostoma deltoideum Girty 1909
Plagiostoma dianense Guo 1985
Plagiostoma euximium Bayle 1878
Plagiostoma gejiuense Guo 1985
Plagiostoma gigantea Boehm 1911
Plagiostoma giganteum Sowerby 1814
Plagiostoma harronis Dacque 1905
Plagiostoma hermanni Voltz 1830
Plagiostoma immensum Repin 2013
Plagiostoma inversa Waagen 1881
Plagiostoma lenaensis Kurushin 1998
Plagiostoma malinovskyi Bytschkov 1976
Plagiostoma nudum Parona 1889
Plagiostoma popovi Kurushin 1985
Plagiostoma punctatum Sowerby 1818
Plagiostoma rodburgensis Whidborne 1883
Plagiostoma semicircularis Goldfuss 1835
Plagiostoma striatum Schlotheim 1820
Plagiostoma sublaeviusculum Krumbeck 1905
Plagiostoma subsimplex Thomas and Peron 1891
Plagiostoma subvaloniense Krumbeck 1923
Plagiostoma tihensis Abbass 1962

Distribution
This cosmopolitan genus occurs in Mid Triassic to Upper Cretaceous strata (from 295.0 to 66.043 Ma.)

Description
These bivalves are epifaunal byssate suspension feeders of up to 12 cm in size. The shells are obliquely ovate, moderately inflated, with obtuse posterior and smaller anterior wings.

Plagiostoma giganteum is a well-known fossil bivalve which occurs in the Blue Lias formation in various parts of the United Kingdom, although it is geographically widespread and has also been found in the Triassic of the United Kingdom.

Gallery

References

Limidae
Prehistoric bivalve genera
Middle Triassic genus first appearances
Ladinian genera
Carnian genera
Norian genera
Rhaetian genera
Hettangian genera
Sinemurian genera
Pliensbachian genera
Toarcian genera
Aalenian genera
Bajocian genera
Bathonian genera
Callovian genera
Oxfordian genera
Kimmeridgian genera
Tithonian genera
Berriasian genera
Valanginian genera
Hauterivian genera
Barremian genera
Aptian genera
Albian genera
Cenomanian genera
Late Cretaceous genus extinctions
Fossils of Uzbekistan
Bissekty Formation